Shaun Jermaine Hobson (born 29 June 1998) is an English professional footballer who plays for Southend United, as a defender.

Early life
Hobson was born in Manchester and was a Manchester United fan in his youth. He played youth football for local side Fletcher Moss Rangers alongside Marcus Rashford and Ro-Shaun Williams.

Career

Early career
Hobson began his career at Burnley in 2014, moving to AFC Bournemouth in 2016. Whilst with Bournemouth he spent loan spells at Eastbourne Borough, Chester, Eastleigh, and Weymouth.

Southend United
After leaving Bournemouth, in September 2020 he signed a one-year contract with Southend United.

Career statistics

Honours
Individual
National League Player of the Month: October 2022

References

1998 births
Living people
English footballers
Burnley F.C. players
AFC Bournemouth players
Eastbourne Borough F.C. players
Chester F.C. players
Eastleigh F.C. players
Weymouth F.C. players
Southend United F.C. players
National League (English football) players
Association football defenders
English Football League players
Black British sportspeople
Fletcher Moss Rangers F.C. players